Nasirul Mulk (born 17 August 1950) served as the seventh caretaker prime minister of Pakistan who previously also served as the 22nd chief justice of Pakistan. A jurist by profession, he was nominated as Chief Justice by the Prime Minister Nawaz Sharif. On 6 July 2014, his appointment as CJP was confirmed by President Mamnoon Hussain. He also previously served as the country's acting Chief Election Commissioner, from 30 November 2013 to 6 July 2014. 

Prior to be elevated as Senior Justice in 2005, Mulk tenured as the chief justice of Peshawar High Court in 2004. Since joining the Supreme Court, Mulk has taken textualist approach on human rights and non-discrimination issues.

On 28 May 2018, he was appointed as caretaker prime minister ahead of the general elections scheduled in July 2018.

Biography

Education and background
Nasirul Mulk was born in tourist locality Swat, Khyber Pakhtunkhwa, on 17 August 1950. He hails from a wealthy and politically influential Paracha family in Swat; his father Kamran Khan was a politician who served as Senator in Senate between 1973 and 1977. His younger brother, Shuja-ul-Mulk, also served as Senator between 2003 and 2009. His uncle, Chacha Karim Bux (or Baksh) was a prominent social worker, while his another sibling Rafil-ul-Mulk was a past mayor of Swat.

After completing high school  from Abbottabad Public School, Mulk attended the Jahanzeb College where he attained BA in Fine Arts in 1970. He enrolled in Peshawar University to study law, also the same year. He excelled well in his law studies and, at one point, his university professors noted him as "talented and a bright student".

In 1972, he obtained a Bachelor of Laws from the Peshawar University. In 1976, Mulk qualified as a barrister and was called to the bar by the Inner Temple in England. He also acquired a Master of Laws (LL.M.) qualification.

Academia and professional career

Upon returning to Pakistan, Mulk practiced law at Peshawar High Court, and briefly tenured as professor of law at the Peshawar University while practicing as a legal practitioner at Peshawar. He also lectured courses on civil law as visiting scholar at the Pakistan Administrative Staff College. Mulk was regarded as notable professor of law at the Peshawar University, and his students often remembered him as "a professor who had complete command on his subject and avoided controversies." Mulk was noted his college students as he always came into the classroom well prepared.

Mulk practiced law for over 17 years at the Peshawar High Court where he built his reputation for competency and a positive approach toward the cases he contested. Mulk was elected Secretary-General of the Peshawar High Court Bar in 1981. He later became president of Peshawar High Court Bar on two occasions, first elected in 1990 and again in 1993. From 1993–94, Mulk was appointed as an advocate general of provincial government of Khyber–Pakhtunkhwa, assisting in legal matters and affairs.

Judicial career
After meeting qualifications for being a judge, Mulk was ascended as judge at the Peshawar High Court on 6 June 1994—a post he retained until 2004. Recommendations approved by Governor of Khyber-Pakhtunkhwa, Mulk was appointed as Chief Justice of Peshawar High Court on 31 July 2004, and moved to Supreme Court of Pakistan in 2005.

Justice Mulk presided and heard the Mukhtār Mā'ī case—the controversial and highly publicized case regarded a gang rape that occurred in 2002. Mulk's judgement held Jirga, facilitated by four male, responsible for the rape while assisted the main accused but didn't find sufficient evidence to stamp the charge of gang-rape on the accused. He reportedly penned his judgement that "Jirgas cannot be allowed to arbitrarily punish in the form of watta satta marriages and gang-rape to settle disputes without being answerable to the law.

On 2 November 2007, Barrister Aitzaz Ahsan submitted an application to the Supreme Court asking that the government be restrained from imposing martial law in Pakistan. Reviewing the application, a seven-panel bench in Supreme Court of Pakistan issued an injunction against the imposition of state emergency on 3 November 2007.

The bench penal was headed by Chief Justice Iftikhar Mohammad Chaudhry. Others included Senior Justices Nasir-ul-Mulk; Fayyaz Ahmad; Bhagwandas; Javaid Iqbal; Shakirullah Jan; Ghulam Rabbani. The injunction was overruled by President Pervez Musharraf and upheld the state emergency imposed on 2 November 2007. He refused to take an oath under PCO 2007 and was ultimately terminated from the Supreme Court. A strong, publicly instigated lawyer's movement which enjoyed support from PML(N) forced President Musharraf to resign in a threat to face impeachment. Mulk was reinstated at the Supreme Court when he took a fresh oath as a judge of the Supreme Court with his seniority intact.

As Chief Justice of Pakistan

He was appointed as Chief Justice on 6 July 2014.

Earlier, he was served as the acting Chief Election Commissioner of Pakistan, from 30 November 2013 to 6 July 2014. His oath was presided by President Mamnoon Hussain in a state ceremony held in President's office in Islamabad.  The outgoing Chief Justice Tassaduq Hussain Jillani had laid down the judicial robes of his office on and handed over to Chief Justice Mulk.

Mulk is described by his fellow judges as "a very proactive judge and is very strict about the implementation of law in its letter and spirit." Mulk is also known for his strictness towards implementation of law and his judgement reflected a textualist approach on human rights and non-discrimination issues. He retired as Chief Justice of Pakistan on 16 July 2015 and was succeeded by Jawad S Khwaja.

As caretaker prime minister 
Shahid Khaqan Abbasi was to complete his tenure as Prime Minister on 31 May 2018. On 28 May, three days before the Abbasi government would complete its five years term, both Abbasi and leader of opposition Syed Khurshid Ahmed Shah agreed on appointing Nasir as the interim Prime Minister of Pakistan. In consequence of their decision, Mulk, in an oath taking ceremony at Presidency Palace, was sworn in as caretaker prime minister of Pakistan.

As caretaker prime minister, his first action was to reshuffle the bureaucracy, the key changes being the appointment of Suhail Aamir as his Principal Secretary and Syed Abu Ahmad Akif as the Cabinet Secretary of Pakistan. During his first few days as prime minister, he instructed the legal team of government to file an appeal against a Lahore High Court decision which has annulled the nomination papers for elections.

Cabinet 
Mulk appointed his cabinet on 5 June 2018, the table below shows the members and their portfolios:

See also
Haziqul Khairi
Iftikhar Muhammad Choudhary
Tassaduq Hussain Jillani
Supreme Court of Pakistan
Constitution of Pakistan
Chief Justice of Pakistan

References

External links

1950 births
Living people
Chief Election Commissioners of Pakistan
Chief justices of Pakistan
Chief Justices of the Peshawar High Court
Members of the Inner Temple
People from Swat District
University of Peshawar alumni
Academic staff of the University of Peshawar
Caretaker prime ministers of Pakistan